Season twenty-three of the television program American Experience originally aired on the PBS network in the United States on October 11, 2010 and concluded on May 16, 2011.  The season contained 12 new episodes and began with the first two parts of the God in America miniseries, "A New Adam" and "A New Eden".  The "God in America" film was also co-produced with the PBS documentary program Frontline.

Episodes

 Denotes multiple chapters that aired on the same date and share the same episode number

References

2010 American television seasons
2011 American television seasons
American Experience